Jared Cole is an Australian theoretical physicist specialising in quantum physics and decoherence theory and its application to solid-state systems. He specialises in using mathematical and computational models to describe the design and operation of quantum computing and quantum electronic devices.

Cole is a professor at RMIT University where he leads study of theoretical condensed-matter physics, superconducting devices, charge transport in nanoscale devices, quantum metrology and decoherence theory. He is the  Group Leader of RMIT's Theoretical Chemical and Quantum Physics Research Group.

Expertise 
Quantum circuit theory, superconducting devices based on the Josephson effect, spin physics, decoherence, measurement and entanglement theory, quantum information and quantum computing.

Career 
Cole completed a Bachelor of Applied Physics and Communication Engineering (Hons) from RMIT University in 2002 and a PhD University of Melbourne in 2006 (Controllable few-state quantum systems for information processing).

Cole was a postdoctoral researcher within the Centre for Quantum Computing Technology, University of Melbourne from 2006 to 2007, studying solid-state quantum computing.

Cole was postdoctoral researcher (initially as an Alexander von Humboldt Fellow) at Karlsruhe University 2007–11, studying qubit characterisation, superconducting qubits and defects in Josephson junctions.

Cole returned to RMIT University in Feb. 2011 as a Vice-Chancellor's senior research fellow, and was made a full professor in Jan 2018.

Cole is a chief investigator within the ARC Centre of Excellence in Future Low-Energy Electronics Technologies (FLEET), investigating the influence of dissipation and decoherence on electronic transport in nanostructures, and its role in electronic devices based on topologically protected conduction channels.

Cole is a chief investigator within the ARC Centre of Excellence for Exciton Science, applying expertise in electron transport, spin physics and decoherence theory to understanding the control and manipulation of excitons to create more-efficient solar cells.

Cole is a founding partner at h-bar, a consultancy dedicated to quantum information and quantum technology.

Publications, Writings
Cole has authored over 80 peer-reviewed publications, has been cited over 2300 times and has an h-index of 26. He holds five patents.

Cole has written general-audience articles on Australia quantum research, low-energy electronics (in The Conversation), and has been interviewed on metric units and ICT energy use.

Major Projects 
 2018 ARC Linkage Infrastructure, Equipment and Facilities Grant – Chief Investigator
 2017-2023 ARC Centre of Excellence in Exciton Science – Chief Investigator
 2017-2023 ARC Centre of Excellence in Future Low-Energy Electronics Technologies – Chief Investigator
 2014-2016 ARC Discovery Project, Understanding and eliminating dissipation in superconducting devices: the origin of two-level defects - Lead Investigator

Awards and fellowships 
 2015 Peter Schwerdtfeger Award of the Australian Association of Alexander von Humboldt Fellows
 2011–2015 Vice-Chancellor's Senior Research Fellow, RMIT University 
 2007-2009 Alexander von Humboldt Fellowship, Karlsruhe University

References

Living people
Australian physicists
Quantum physicists
Academic staff of RMIT University
Year of birth missing (living people)